The Royal Style and Titles Act 2013 is an act of the National Parliament of Solomon Islands which altered the monarch's title in Solomon Islands.

The bill was assented by Governor-General Sir Frank Kabui on 10 October 2013 and commenced on 1 November 2013.

Background 

At the 1952 Commonwealth Prime Ministers' Economic Conference, Commonwealth prime ministers, after months of discussion on whether the newly ascended Queen Elizabeth II should have a uniform Royal Styles and Titles throughout the Commonwealth or whether realms should adopt their own styles and titles, it was agreed that each member of the Commonwealth "should use for its own purposes a form of the Royal Style and Titles which suits its own particular circumstances but retains a substantial element which is common to all". It was decided that the monarch's title in all her realms have, as their common element the description of the Sovereign as "Queen of Her Realms and Territories and Head of the Commonwealth". The prime ministers agreed to pass appropriate legislation in their respective parliaments.

After independence in 1978, Solomon Islands became an independent constitutional monarchy within the Commonwealth. A bill to alter the monarch's title in relation to Solomon Islands was introduced in 2013.

Legislation 

The bill to alter the monarch's style was inroduced in 2013. The bill was passed by the Parliament on 1 August 2013, and received royal assent from the Governor-General on 10 October 2013.

The Act formally changed the Queen's title in Solomon Islands to:

This style was already in non-statutory use since 1988, when it was included in the Ministry of Foreign Affairs and External Trade Manual.

Commencement 

Under the provisions of the Act, it commenced on the date of publication in the Solomon Islands Gazette on 1 November 2013.

See also 
Monarchy of Solomon Islands
Governor-General of Solomon Islands
Royal Style and Titles Act

References 

Politics of the Solomon Islands
Acts of Parliament of Solomon Islands